Break-even (or break even) most often refers to:

 Break-even, a point where any difference between plus or minus or equivalent changes
 Break-even (economics) 
 Breakeven is the point in the fusion energy gain factor where input and output energy is equal
 "Breakeven" (song), a 2008 song by The Script
 Break Even, an Australian hardcore punk band